Haloacid dehalogenase-like hydrolase domain-containing protein 2 is an enzyme that in humans is encoded by the HDHD2 gene.

References

Further reading